Next Plateau Entertainment (formerly Next Plateau Records) is an American record label that currently operates in association with Republic Records.

Background
1980s

New York City-based independent label Next Plateau Records began in the early 1980s and ultimately became a successful independent label. Writers and producers signed to the record company include John Robie, who produced C-bank’s single, “One More Shot”. The company also signed the female rap act Salt-N-Pepa, who went on to score several hits on the US Hot 100 including the songs "Push It" and Shake Your Thang, and freestyle act Sweet Sensation, which had a hit with the song “I’m Hooked On You”.

1990s

During the 1990s Next Plateau had several hits on the American charts and some international charts with Paperboy’s “Ditty”; Sybil’s “Don’t Make Me Over” and “Walk On By”; Boy Krazy’s “That’s What Love Can Do”; KWS’s “Please Don’t Go”; and with their biggest act, the female trio Salt-N-Pepa, with hits such as "Expression", "Do You Want Me", and “Let’s Talk About Sex”.

In 1996, Next Plateau was distributed by Roadrunner Records, which at the time was distributed by RED Distribution. The company's assets (excluding the company's name) were later sold to PolyGram Records, Roadrunner, and Warner/Chappell Music in 1999, thus dissolving the label.

2000s

In 2004, Next Plateau was restarted by company founder Eddie O’Loughlin, who signed dance music twins Nina Sky. Next Plateau now focused on electro, dance, and trance music. Next Plateau’s Eddie O’Loughlin also has an A&R consultancy role in selecting the artists, songs, and producers for NBC's "The Voice" television show.

Founder

Eddie O'Loughlin is the president and founder of Next Plateau Entertainment and previously co-founded the successful Midland International Records for RCA.  O'Loughlin has a reputation for being a hands-on music executive. Celebrities that have worked with him, but not necessarily part of Next Plateau, include John Travolta, Carol Douglas, Silver Convention, Jenny Burton, Sharon Brown, Salt-N-Pepa, Paperboy, Sybil, Sweet Sensation, KWS, and Nina Sky.

Eddie O, as he is known in the business, is a member of ASCAP, a voting member of the Rock and Roll Hall of Fame, and the Grammy organization NARAS.

Artists

Current
JTX
Sarah McLeod (musician)
Nina Sky
Madcon
Crazy Frog
Jamesy P
Patrizio Buanne
Staci Flood
T2
Gareth Emery
Antoine Clamaran
Ian Carey
Mary Sarah

Some Former Acts
4 P.M.
Antoinette
Black Rock & Ron
HellRazor aka Robert S
Boy Krazy
Jenny Burton
C-Bank
Carol Douglas
KWS
Andrea Martin
Paperboy
Salt-N-Pepa
Scotty D
Sweet Sensation
Sybil
John Travolta
Ultramagnetic MC's
Ottawan
Derelect Camp

Related Links
Official Next Plateau Entertainment Website
Official Next Plateau Entertainment Facebook
Official Next Plateau Entertainment Twitter
Official Next Plateau Entertainment Google+
Official Next Plateau Entertainment Pinterest
Official Next Plateau Entertainment YouTube

See also 
 List of record labels

Record labels established in 1984
American record labels
Hip hop record labels
Labels distributed by Universal Music Group